Paolo Lorenzi was the defending champion, but he chose to compete at Wimbledon instead.Carlos Berlocq won the final 6–0, 7–6(1) against Pablo Andújar.

Seeds

Draw

Finals

Top half

Bottom half

References
 Main Draw

Camparini Gioielli Cup - Singles
Camparini Gioielli Cup